Elections to Preston Borough Council were held on 7 May 2000.  One third of the council was up for election and the council stayed under no overall control.

After the election, the composition of the council was:

Election result

Ward results

This election was the last to be held before a boundary review increased the number of electoral wards and redistributed the councillors.

Ashton

Avenham

Brookfield

Cadley

Central

Deepdale

Fishwick

Greyfriars

Ingol

Larches

Moor Park

Rural East

Rural West

Ribbleton

Riversway

Sharoe Green

Sherwood

St Matthews

Tulketh

References
2000 Preston election result

2000 English local elections
2000
2000s in Lancashire